KFUM-Kameratene Oslo is the sports branch of the local YMCA in Oslo, Norway. It has sections for association football, futsal, volleyball and track and field. The football team currently plays in 1. divisjon, the second tier of the Norwegian football league system.

The club was founded on 1 January 1939. Its traditional base is in downtown Oslo, but it now plays its matches at KFUM Arena at Ekebergsletta.

Football
In 2008 KFUM-Kameratene Oslo won their 3. divisjon group, and also won the playoff to gain promotion. It had formerly failed in such a playoff in 2004. In their first year in the 2. divisjon, the third tier, they finished fourth. In 2010, and again in 2013, they ended up in second place. In 2015 they finally were promoted to the 1. divisjon as champions of Group 1. The team was coached by former football player Ståle Andersen. In 2018, KFUM finished in second plays in the 2018 2. divisjon group 2 and qualified for promotion play-offs. The team defeated Åsane with 4–3 on aggregate in the play-offs and won promotion to the 2019 1. divisjon.

Recent history 
{|class="wikitable"
|-bgcolor="#efefef"
! Season
! 
! Pos.
! Pl.
! W
! D
! L
! GS
! GA
! P
!Cup
!Notes
|-
|2006
|3. divisjon
|align=right |3
|align=right|22||align=right|12||align=right|5||align=right|5
|align=right|62||align=right|27||align=right|41
|Second qualifying round
|
|-
|2007
|3. divisjon
|align=right |2
|align=right|22||align=right|15||align=right|3||align=right|2
|align=right|72||align=right|22||align=right|48
|Second round
|
|-
|2008
|3. divisjon
|align=right bgcolor=#DDFFDD| 1
|align=right|22||align=right|18||align=right|3||align=right|1
|align=right|103||align=right|15||align=right|57
||Second round
|Promoted to the 2. divisjon
|-
|2009
|2. divisjon
|align=right |4
|align=right|26||align=right|14||align=right|6||align=right|6
|align=right|55||align=right|34||align=right|48
||First round
|
|-
|2010
|2. divisjon
|align=right |2
|align=right|26||align=right|18||align=right|3||align=right|5
|align=right|69||align=right|30||align=right|56
||Second round
|
|-
|2011 
|2. divisjon
|align=right |9
|align=right|26||align=right|10||align=right|8||align=right|8
|align=right|55||align=right|38||align=right|38
||Second round
|
|-
|2012
|2. divisjon
|align=right |7
|align=right|26||align=right|11||align=right|5||align=right|10
|align=right|48||align=right|49||align=right|38
||Second round
|
|-
|2013
|2. divisjon
|align=right |2
|align=right|26||align=right|17||align=right|6||align=right|3
|align=right|62||align=right|26||align=right|57
||Second round
|
|-
|2014 
|2. divisjon
|align=right |5
|align=right|26||align=right|13||align=right|6||align=right|7
|align=right|44||align=right|31||align=right|45
||First round
|
|-
|2015
|2. divisjon
|align=right bgcolor=#DDFFDD| 1
|align=right|26||align=right|20||align=right|2||align=right|4
|align=right|62||align=right|28||align=right|62
||Second round
|Promoted to the 1. divisjon
|-
|2016 
|1. divisjon
|align=right bgcolor="#FFCCCC"| 15
|align=right|30||align=right|6||align=right|8||align=right|16
|align=right|31||align=right|48||align=right|26
||Third round
|Relegated to 2. divisjon
|-
|2017 
|2. divisjon
|align=right |7
|align=right|26||align=right|10||align=right|4||align=right|12
|align=right|43||align=right|39||align=right|34
||Third round
|
|-
|2018 
|2. divisjon
|align=right bgcolor=#DDFFDD| 2
|align=right|26||align=right|13||align=right|8||align=right|5
|align=right|47||align=right|32||align=right|47
||Third round
|Promoted to the 1. divisjon
|-
|2019
|1. divisjon
|align=right|4
|align=right|30||align=right|13||align=right|9||align=right|8
|align=right|58||align=right|42||align=right|48
||Quarter-final
|
|-
|2020 
|1. divisjon
|align=right|8
|align=right|30||align=right|10||align=right|9||align=right|11
|align=right|44||align=right|44||align=right|39
||Cancelled
|
|-
|2021 
|1. divisjon
|align=right|5
|align=right|30||align=right|12||align=right|8||align=right|10
|align=right|46||align=right|45||align=right|44
||Quarter-final
|
|-
|2022
|1. divisjon
|align=right|4
|align=right|30||align=right|15||align=right|7||align=right|8
|align=right|61||align=right|48||align=right|52
||Third round
|
|-
|}
Source:

Players and staff

Current squad

Coaching staff

Administrative staff

Futsal
KFUM-Kameratene Oslo Futsal is the futsal department of KFUM-Kameratene Oslo They won the Norwegian Futsal Premier League in 2009–10, after receiving silver medals in the inaugural season.

References

External links
 Official website
 KFUM Arena - Nordic Stadiums

 
Football clubs in Oslo
Futsal clubs in Norway
Sport in Oslo
Association football clubs established in 1939
Oslo
1939 establishments in Norway